
Gmina Pietrowice Wielkie is a rural gmina (administrative district) in Racibórz County, Silesian Voivodeship, in southern Poland, on the Czech border.

Villages
Gmina Pietrowice Wielkie contains the villages and settlements of Amandów, Cyprzanów, Gródczanki, Kornice, Krowiarki, Lekartów, Maków, Pawłów, Pietrowice Wielkie, Samborowice and Żerdziny.

Neighbouring gminas
Gmina Pietrowice Wielkie is bordered by the town of Racibórz and by the gminas of Baborów, Kietrz, Krzanowice and Rudnik. It also borders the Czech Republic.

Twin towns – sister cities

Gmina Pietrowice Wielkie is twinned with:
 Liederbach am Taunus, Germany
 Sudice, Czech Republic

Gallery

References

Pietrowice Wielkie
Racibórz County